Joseph Jefferson Farjeon (4 June 1883 – 6 June 1955) was an English crime and mystery novelist, playwright and screenwriter. His father, brother and sister also developed successful careers in the literary world. His "Ben" novels were reissued in 2015 and 2016.

Family
Born in Hampstead, London, Farjeon was the grandson of the American actor Joseph Jefferson, after whom he was named. His parents were Jefferson's daughter Maggie (1853–1935) and Benjamin Farjeon (1838–1903), a Victorian novelist, who was born in Whitechapel to an impoverished immigrant family and travelled widely before returning to England in 1868. Joseph Jefferson Farjeon's brothers were Herbert, a dramatist and scholar, and Harry, who became a composer. His sister Eleanor became a children's author. His daughter Joan Jefferson Farjeon (1913–2006) was a theatre set designer.

Career: "creepy skill"
Farjeon worked for ten years for Amalgamated Press in London before going freelance, working nine hours a day at his writing desk. One of Farjeon's best known works was a 1925 play, Number 17, which was adapted into several films, including Number Seventeen (1932) directed by Alfred Hitchcock, and joined the UK Penguin Crime series as a novel in 1939. He also wrote the screenplay for Michael Powell's My Friend the King (1932) and provided the story for Bernard Vorhaus's The Ghost Camera (1933).

Farjeon's crime novels were admired by Dorothy L. Sayers, who called him "unsurpassed for creepy skill in mysterious adventures". His obituarist in The Times talked of "ingenious and entertaining plots and characterization," while The New York Times, reviewing an early novel, Master Criminal (1924), states that "Mr. Farjeon displays a great deal of knowledge about story-telling... and multiplies the interest of his plot through a terse, telling style and a rigid compression." The Saturday Review of Literature called Death in the Inkwell (1942) an "amusing, satirical, and frequently hair-raising yarn of an author who got dangerously mixed up with his imaginary characters."

A significant revival of interest in the Golden age of detective fiction followed the 2014 success of The British Library reissue of Mystery in White: A Christmas Crime Story. Two more reissues by Farjeon followed in 2015: Thirteen Guests and The Z Murders. Mystery in White is also one of at least three of his novels to have appeared in Italian, French, Dutch (Het mysterie in de sneeuw – The Mystery in the Snow), German, Spanish, Polish and Russian.

Seven Dead has been reissued by The British Library (September 2017). The novel sees the return of Detective-Inspector Kendall, first heard of, in the words of its central character "in the case of the Thirteen Guests. What I liked about him was that he didn't play the violin, or have a wooden leg or anything of that sort. He just got on with it."

Since 2016, all eight Detective Ben novels have been reissued by HarperCollins from the Collins Crime Club archive as a series titled "Ben the tramp mystery".

Selected works

Crime fiction and other works

Detective Ben series

Under the pseudonym Anthony Swift
Murder at a Police Station (London, Hale, 1943)
November the Ninth at Kersea (London, Hale, 1944)
Interrupted Honeymoon (London, Hale, 1945)

The Detective X. Crook series
J.J. Farjeon's fictional character Detective X. Crook appeared from 1925–1929 in 57 issues of Flynn’s Weekly Detective Fiction.

Short story collections
Down the Green Stairs and Other Stories (Down the Green Stairs, February the Seventh, It Happened in a Fog, Tomatoes in Egg-Cups) (London, Todd, 1943)
Waiting for the Police and Other Short Stories (The Other Side of the Bars, Waiting for the Police, Where's Mr. Jones?) (London, Todd, 1943)
The Invisible Companion and Other Stories (February the Seventh, In Reverse, The Invisible Companion, The Room That Got Lost, Supper Is Served) (London, Todd, 1943)
The Twist and Other Stories (The Twist, The Room, In Reverse) (London, Vallancey Press, 1944)
The Haunted Lake and Other Stories (The Haunted Lake, Midnight Adventure, Supper is Served, Exchange is No Robbery) (London, Polybooks, 1945)
Midnight Adventure and Other Stories (Midnight Adventure, The Vase and the Candlestick, Waiting for the Police, It Happened in the Fog, Exchange is No Robbery) (London & New York, Polybooks, 1946)

Other short stories
The Tale of a Hat (A Romance of the Thames); Pearson's Magazine, issue 172, April 1910
Unanswered Riddles; Pearson's Magazine, issue 201, September 1912
Romance Passes By; My Best Thriller. A Collection of Stories Chosen by Their Own Authors, London: Faber, 1933
The Room in the Tower; My Best Mystery Story: A Collection of Stories Chosen by Their Own Authors, London: Faber, 1939
Secrets in the Snow; Stories of the Underworld, London: Faber, 1942
Sergeant Dobbin Works It Out; Evening Standard Detective Book: Second Series, London: Gollancz, 1951

Plays
Number 17 (1925)
After Dark (1926)
Enchantment (1927)
Philomel (1932)

References

Other sources
Bordman, Gerald Martin. American Theatre: A Chronicle of Comedy and Drama, 1914–1930. Oxford University Press, 1995.
Krueger, Christine L. Encyclopedia of British Writers, 19th Century. Infobase Publishing, 2003.

External links

 

1883 births
1955 deaths
20th-century English novelists
20th-century English non-fiction writers
English crime fiction writers
English Jews
English male journalists
English male novelists
English people of American descent
English male screenwriters
Joseph
Writers from London
20th-century English male writers
20th-century English screenwriters